The UniSport Nationals is a multi-sport event held annually between the 43 Australian universities and tertiary institutions. Overseen by UniSport, the peak governing body of university sport in Australia, the nationals is the flagship event on the university sporting calendar and attracts over 5,000 student athletes each year. The nationals consist of Division 1, Division 2 and a smaller number of standalone sporting competitions held throughout the year.

History 

The inaugural Australian University Games were held in Brisbane in 1993. The 2015 Australian University Games hosted in Gold Coast was the largest in its history, with more than 8,000 student athletes competing across 32 sports.

The University of Sydney has been the most successful amongst competing universities in the Australian University Games, having achieved "Overall Champion" a total of nine times (1995–1996, 1999–2003, 2007, 2014). The University of Western Australia became the first University outside the big 3 (the University of Sydney, the University of Melbourne, and Monash University) to win the overall champion title since 1994, when it clinched the 2010 title. The final Australian University Games concluded in 2017 with the University of Technology Sydney, claiming their second overall champion title. The UniSport Nationals replaced the Australian University Games from 2018 onwards.

Member universities

Map of host cities

Results 
Overall Champion

The university with the most pennants across all sports is awarded the Overall Champion Trophy.

Per Capita Champion

The university with the highest points based on performance and enrolment numbers is awarded the Doug Ellis Per Capita Trophy.

Spirit Champion

The university that has shown the best sportsmanship is awarded John White Spirit Trophy.

Table of Results

Sports Trophies

Athletics

Overall

Men 
QLD Licensed Vietuallers Asc. IV Athletics Trophy

Women 
The G.R. Hulbert Trophy

Australian Football

Men - Division One 
The E.J Hartung Cup Intervarsity is Awarded to the Winning Men's Football Team

Men - Division Two

Women

Badminton

Men

Women

Baseball 

Australian Universities Championship Series

Basketball

Men 
AUSA Men's Basketball Shield

Women

Beach Volleyball

Overall

Men

Women

Mixed

Cross Country

Overall

Cycling 
The 2013 AUGs were essentially dominated by the strong team from Sydney University (SUVelo), who took out the men's, women's, and overall champion trophies.

Overall

Diving

Overall

Fencing

Overall

Football

Men

Women 
Hugh McCredie Trophy " The Intervarsity Cup" is Awarded for Women's Winning Team

Futsal

Men's Division 1

Women's Division 1

Men's Division 2

Women's Division 2

Golf

Overall

Men

Women

Handball

Mixed Division 1

Mixed Division 2

Hockey

Men 
The Syme Cup is Awarded to the Winning Men's Hockey Team.

Women 
Inter University Women's Hockey Cup is Awarded to the Winning Women's Hockey Team.

Judo

Overall

Kendo

Overall

Lawn Bowls

Open

Netball

Women

Mixed

Rowing 

Rowing was one of the first events competed for between Australian universities. Men's Eights have been raced since 1888, lightweight fours since 1963, and women's eights since 1978. The NSW Centenary Cup is awarded for the university that scores the most points overall in all events; however, the most prestigious events remain the Men's and Women's Eights.

Overall

Men's Eight 
The Oxford and Cambridge Cup is awarded to the winning Men's Eight.

Women's Eight 
The Godfrey Tanner Cup is awarded to the winning Women's Eight.

Rugby Union 7's

Men 
The Nick Farr-Jones Cup is Awarded to the Winning Men's Rugby Union Team.

Women

Sailing 
A demonstration sport in 2010 and a full sport in 2011, having been revived after a long period of decline. See Australian University Sailing.

Teams Racing

Match Racing

Softball

Squash

Men's

Women's

Swimming

Overall 
Berge Phillips Trophy is Awarded for Winning Team Overall

Surfing

Overall

Table Tennis

Men

Table Tennis

Women

Taekwondo

Overall

Tennis

Men

Women

Tenpin Bowling

Open

Touch

Men

Women

Mixed

Ultimate Frisbee

Volleyball

Men

Women

Water Polo

Men

Women

References

External links 
 Official website

 
Recurring sporting events established in 1992